Sir Colin Norman Thornton-Kemsley,  (2 September 1903 – 17 July 1977) was a Conservative and National Liberal politician in the United Kingdom.  He was the Member of Parliament (MP) for Kincardine and Western Aberdeenshire from 1939 to 1950, and for North Angus and Mearns from 1950 until his retirement at the 1964 general election.

Early life

Thornton-Kemsley was born in 1903 and grew up in a London suburb. He was educated at Chigwell School, and graduated from Wadham College, Oxford.

Whilst he had a Scottish grandfather, he had no real connection to Scotland until 1930, when he married Alice Thornton; his second cousin and the granddaughter of prominent Dundee lawyer, Sir Thomas Thornton, who had purchased Thornton castle in Kincardineshire in 1893, and at the time of the wedding Thornton was the owner and resident of the property.

Political career

Thornton-Kemsley was an active member of the Conservative constituency association for the London suburb of Epping, where he lived. He also served as the Honorary Treasurer of Essex and Middlesex Provincial Area, National Union of Conservative and Unionist Associations. 

As a member of the Epping constituency party he made a name for himself in Conservative Party circles as a Neville Chamberlain loyalist who was central to bringing about a censure of Winston Churchill by the Epping Conservative Association.

In 1939 Malcolm Barclay-Harvey, the incumbent Unionist Member of Parliament for Kincardine and Western Aberdeenshire, was offered the position of Governor of South Australia. Thornton-Kemsley, due to his previous role in trying to bringing about a censure of Churchill by the Epping Conservative Association, was offered the candidacy.

At the outbreak of the Second World War in 1939, Kemsley apologized. Churchill's reply was characteristic: "I certainly think that Englishmen ought to start fair with one another from the outset in so grievous a struggle, and so far as I am concerned the past is dead." (See Thornton-Kemsley, “Winston Secures his Base” in Through Winds and Tides, 1974, pp. 
26–36.)

Having joined the Territorial Army (TA) before the war on 31 July 1925, where he was commissioned into the 85th (East Anglian) Field Artillery Brigade of the Royal Artillery, Thornton-Kemsley served during the war. His unit, now the 85th (East Anglian) Field Artillery Regiment, Royal Artillery, was mobilised but went to attend the British Army Staff College at Camberley, from where he graduated and then served as a staff officer with Scottish Command and later Eastern Command.

References

External links 
British Army Officers 1939−1945

1903 births
1977 deaths
Members of the Parliament of the United Kingdom for Scottish constituencies
Unionist Party (Scotland) MPs
UK MPs 1935–1945
UK MPs 1945–1950
UK MPs 1950–1951
UK MPs 1951–1955
UK MPs 1955–1959
UK MPs 1959–1964
Royal Artillery officers
British Army personnel of World War II
Alumni of Wadham College, Oxford
British surveyors
Knights Bachelor
Graduates of the Staff College, Camberley
Officers of the Order of the British Empire